Eusynthemis netta is a species of dragonfly of the family Synthemistidae,
known as the pretty tigertail. 
It is a medium-sized dragonfly with black and yellow markings.
It inhabits rainforest streams in north-eastern Australia

See also
 List of Odonata species of Australia

References

Synthemistidae
Odonata of Australia
Insects of Australia
Endemic fauna of Australia
Taxa named by Günther Theischinger
Insects described in 1999